The national flag of the Republic of Moldova is a vertical triband of blue, yellow, and red, charged with the coat of arms of Moldova (an eagle holding a shield charged with an aurochs) on the centre bar. The reverse is mirrored. The flag ratio is 1:2. Until further provisions, the State Flag of Moldova is used as the national flag and ensign as well; that is, civil, state and war flag and ensign.

The blue-yellow-red tricolour of Moldova is inspired by the flag of Romania, reflecting the two countries' national and cultural affinity. On Moldova's flag, the yellow stripe is charged with the national arms. Like the Romanian coat of arms, the Moldovan arms, adopted in 1990, features a dark golden eagle holding an Orthodox Christian cross in its beak. Instead of a sword, the eagle is holding an olive branch, symbolising peace. The blue and red shield on the eagle's chest is charged with the traditional symbols of Moldova: an aurochs' head, flanked by a rose in dexter and a crescent in sinister and having a star between its horns, all of gold. These two national flags are also very similar to the flags of Chad and Andorra, which are all based on vertical stripes of blue, yellow, and red.

Colours

Until 2010, the colour shades of the Moldavian flag were not explicitly named. The Regulation regarding the flag stated that the colours of the flag must match the ones shown in the annex. Moldavian heraldist and vexillologist Silviu Andrieș-Tabac stated in an interview that in 1990, when the flag was being created, "it was taken into account that many countries have similar tricolour flags. As a result, it was decided to abandon the ultramarine blue, which is present on the Romanian flag, in favour of the emerald-blue, used on the mural paintings of Voroneț monastery...".

The French Album des pavillons nationaux et des marques distinctives (2000) by Armand du Payrat and Daniel Roudaut had suggested the following Pantone nuances, including those of the coat of arms: blue 549, yellow 143, red 186, green 340 and brown 464.

However, a new law from 2010 defined the colours of the flag as Berlin blue, chrome yellow and vermillon red. The exact matches, according to annex no. 2, are as follows:

Governmental flags

Governmental standards

In 2010 four new governmental standards, derived from the state flag, were established. The standard of the Minister of Defense has yet to be defined, its temporary replacement being the state flag. The other three standards, of the President, President of the Parliament and Prime Minister, are described as follows:

A square flag with the coat of arms of Moldova on center, whose aquila is golden (instead of dark gold, or brown). The background of the flag is purple for the President, red for the President of the Parliament and blue for the Prime Minister.

The original flags are kept in their respective offices. Duplicates are hoisted on the official residences when the people entitled to them are inside; also on their respective cars.

The design of the standard of the minister of defense and regulations concerning its use is also provided for by Decree No. 1194 of 17 June 2014.

Other governmental flags

Several governmental organizations have flags established by parliamentary or governmental decisions:
 The Department of Civil Defense and Exceptional Situations of Moldova
 The Customs of Moldova
 The Border Guard of Moldova
 The Information and Security Service of Moldova
 Principal State Inspectorate for Technical Supervising of Dangerous Industrial Objects

Military flags

The flag of the National Army of the Republic of Moldova represents a unique military vexillologic insignia. It is the symbol of the military glory, of the tradition and continuity, honor and loyalty of the soldiers and officers to the country.

The cloth of the flag has the same chromatics as the state flag of the Republic of Moldova. Its partition reminds of the old Moldavian military flags, from 1834 to 1863. The red central cross reminds of Saint George, the patron and protector of the medieval Moldavian army. The motto "Pentru Onoare! Pentru Patrie! Pentru Tricolor!" represents the belief of the Moldovan soldiers.

The military colours of the Moldavian Army units consists of the state flag, measuring 825×1650 mm, with golden fringes and tassels, having the unit's battle cry inscribed on obverse, above the coat of arms, and the unit's name on reverse, below the coat of arms. The flag is fixed on a wooden rod, measuring 2500 mm, with a standard pole on top. Previous regulation, which hasn't been explicitly repealed in 2010, described the inscriptions on the flag as follows: on obverse, above the coat of arms, "PENTRU  PATRIA  NOASTRĂ" (For our Fatherland), and below "REPUBLICA MOLDOVA" (Republic of Moldova); on reverse, above the coat of arms, the unit's name.

The military colours, as well as their regulations, are issued by decree of the President of Moldova.

The military colours of the units of the Ministry of Internal Affairs are reproducing the state flag, with golden fringes and tassels, having the motto "PENTRU PATRIE" (For Fatherland) inscribed on obverse, above the coat of arms, and the text "MINISTERUL AFACERILOR INTERNE AL REPUBLICII MOLDOVA" (The Ministry of Internal Affairs of the Republic of Moldova) on reverse, below the top margin. Also, on reverse, above the coat of arms, is inscribed the name of the unit, all letters being embroidered with golden thread.

Flag Day

Since April 2010, the Flag Day of Moldova is celebrated on 27 April each year. On this day in 1990, the tricolor was officially adopted by the Supreme Soviet of the Moldavian SSR as the state flag of the country.

History 
Romania and Moldova are historically and culturally almost identical, and due to this, the flags Moldova has or has had are highly similar.

The current flag of Moldova was created in 1990 and is based on the national colors of Romanians, the blue-yellow-red tricolor. The reverse side differed from the Romanian flag in proportion, and by having a lighter blue.

The flag of Moldova was one of the national flags with differing obverse and reverse sides — the others being the flags of Paraguay. Although the reverse of the flag was officially stated as not containing any coat of arms, Moldovan flags with a coat of arms printed on the reverse were also used.

On 26 November 2010, a new law regarding the State Flag of Moldova became effective. One of the most important provisions has the reverse defined as a mirrored image of the obverse.

The flags of the Moldavian Democratic Republic (MDR) and some of the proposed flags for the Republic of Moldova display the head of an aurochs, which is derived from the flag and coat of arms of Moldavia.

Flags of subdivisions

Autonomous Territorial Units

Districts

Former counties

See also
Coat of arms of Moldova
Flag of the Moldavian Soviet Socialist Republic
Flags whose reverse differs from the obverse
List of flags of Moldova
Flag of Transnistria

References

External links

Law no. 217 from 17 September 2010 regarding the State Flag of the Republic of Moldova
Parliamentary decision no. 17-XII from 12 May 1990 regarding the approval of the regulation regarding the State Flag of the Republic of Moldova (Moldovan Presidential website)
 Vlad Mischevca, The National Tricolor. Introduction to vexilology in "Akademos", no. 2(17), June 2010.
 Flag of Moldova at Vexillographia

 
Moldova
National symbols of Moldova
Moldova
Moldova